Charles David Powell, Baron Powell of Bayswater,  (born 6 July 1941) is a British diplomat and businessman who served as a key foreign policy adviser to Prime Minister Margaret Thatcher during the 1980s.

Early life and education
Son of Air Vice Marshal John Frederick Powell and his wife Ysolda, Powell was educated at the Cathedral Choir School, Canterbury; King's School, Canterbury; and New College, Oxford, graduating BA in 1963 with first class honours in Modern History. One brother, Sir Chris Powell, is an advertiser; another, Jonathan, was chief of staff to Prime Minister Tony Blair.

Career

Diplomatic
Charles Powell joined His Majesty's Diplomatic Service in 1963. His first posting was as Third Secretary to Helsinki in 1965, where he was promoted to Second Secretary. In 1968, he returned to London, spending three years at the FCO. He was posted as First Secretary to Washington, D.C. in 1971, as the Ambassador's Private Secretary. Subsequent postings were to Bonn in 1974 and, as Counsellor, to UKREP Brussels in 1980. He was seconded to 10 Downing Street and served as Private Secretary to Margaret Thatcher (1983 to 1990) and then as Private Secretary to John Major (1990 to 1991). During his time working for Mrs Thatcher, he became one of her most trusted foreign policy aides.

Business
Since 1992 Powell has served on the boards of Jardine Matheson Holdings Ltd, LVMH Moet-Hennessy Louis Vuitton, Caterpillar Inc., Textron Corporation, Mandarin Oriental International Ltd, Hongkong Land Ltd and Schindler Holding Ltd.  He chaired the international advisory board of Rolls-Royce and is a member of the advisory boards of Barrick Gold, Chubb Insurance and Thales, and a strategic adviser to BAE Systems and an adviser to Bowmark Private Equity.   He was for ten years chairman of both the China-Britain Business Council and the Singapore British Business Council, as well as chairman of the British Government's Asia Task Force.

House of Lords
He currently sits as a crossbench life peer in the House of Lords.  He is currently a member of the Joint Committee on the National Security Strategy.

Charities
He is chairman of the British Museum Trust, chairman of the Trustees of the Said Business School at Oxford University, and trustee of the Said Foundation, the Margaret Thatcher Scholarships at Oxford, the Margaret Thatcher Archive Trust at Cambridge, chairman of the Atlantic Partnership and a member of King's College London Campaign Board.

Personal life
He married Carla Bonardi in 1964. They have two sons, born in 1967 and 1968.

He has three younger brothers, Chris (co-founder of DDB Advertising Agency, and currently chair of NESTA), Roderick (Rod), and Jonathan, the Chief of Staff to Prime Minister Tony Blair, a member of the Labour Party.

Powell is an Honorary Fellow of the Ashmolean Museum in Oxford, a Foundation Fellow of Somerville College Oxford, and an Honorary Fellow of King's College, London, a Visiting Professor at St Mary's University and has an honorary DSc from Shiv Nadar University in India.

Honours
He was appointed Knight Commander of the Order of St Michael and St George (KCMG) in the Prime Minister's retirement honours list of December 1990.
In 2001 he was awarded the Public Service Star by the government of Singapore.
He was created a life peer in the 2000 New Year Honours as Baron Powell of Bayswater, of Canterbury in the County of Kent, being Gazetted on 15 February 2000.

In the media
Powell has been interviewed for multiple documentaries about Margaret Thatcher and about foreign policy.

In popular culture
Powell was portrayed by Terence Harvey in the 2004 BBC production of The Alan Clark Diaries, by James Fox in 2009's Margaret and by Dominic Rowan in Netflix's ''The Crown (TV Series)'.

References

External links
 Atlantic Partnership Staff Biography
 Dod's personal biography

1941 births
Caterpillar Inc. people
Crossbench life peers
Knights Commander of the Order of St Michael and St George
Directors of LVMH
Living people
Members of HM Diplomatic Service
Trustees of the British Museum
Alumni of New College, Oxford
People educated at The King's School, Canterbury
Recipients of the Bintang Bakti Masyarakat
Fellows of Somerville College, Oxford
Fellows of King's College London
20th-century British diplomats
Life peers created by Elizabeth II